The Caryandinae are a small subfamily of grasshoppers found mostly in China, India, Indochina and Malesia, but the large type genus Caryanda also has species from Africa.  Genera were previously placed in the tribe Oxyini, with the subfamily erected by Yin & Liu in 1987.

Genera
The Orthoptera Species File includes:
 Caryanda Stål, 1878
 Cercina Stål, 1878
 Lemba Huang, 1983; current records from southern China, species:
 Lemba bituberculata Yin & Liu, 1987
 Lemba daguanensis Huang, 1983 - type species
 Lemba guizhouensis Yin, Zhang & You, 2013
 Lemba motinagar Ingrisch, Willemse & Shishodia, 2004
 Lemba sichuanensis Ma, Guo & Li, 1994
 Lemba sinensis (Chang, 1939)
 Lemba viriditibia Niu & Zheng, 1992
 Lemba wushanensis Yin, Shen & Yin, 2020
 Lemba yunnana Ma & Zheng, 1994
 Lemba zhengi Li, 1994

References

External links

Orthoptera subfamilies
Orthoptera of Asia
Acrididae